Glumpers is a CG animated television series by Motion Pictures, S.A.(Spain) co-produced with Televisió de Catalunya. The series currently consists of two seasons, which have 104 episodes of 2 minutes each.

Story 
The Glumpers are a gang of blob-like creatures who live together. Each 2-minute episode revolves around them getting involved with everyday situations, along with some more bizarre ones.

Main characters
The Glumpers are a group of friends with totally stereotyped and conflicting personalities who live, or at least try, in a beautiful house outside Glumperona. There are six main quirky leading glumpers:

Fubble
The essence of laziness, he hates any kind of physical exercise, excepting jaw movement, eating is his other big passion.

Quigly
Hyper-active little glumper, who is always in high spirits, he does everything too much Quigly, so, almost always he tends to put his foot in it.

Webster
Quiet and shy, but always shows up how to join in the fun. Submissive and good-natured, he's always in the mood for playing...

Gobo
A big size happy-go-lucky glumper who is a master chef and graceful dancer. He is the only one who tries to make the common sense come up, a misunderstood leader

Dudd
The most mischievous Glumper and Booker's brother.

Booker
The smartest glumper, he is highly gifted, the opposite of his brother: Dudd

Seasons

Episodes
 Day at the Beach
 The Egg
 Night of Horror
 Ski Day
 Skate
 Meteorite
 The Stairs
 The Videogame
 UFO
 The Stick
 Discoteque
 Turn the Volume Down
 Raffle
 Tattoo
 Cleaning
 The Video
 Fishing at the Lake
 Insomnia
 Digestive Troubles
 Sand Castle
 Baywatch
 Airport
 Teletransport Remix
 Clone Matic
 Out of Remote Control
 The Omelette
 Avalanche!
 Romantic Date
 TV Passion
 Security Measures
 The Final Method
 Crazy About Soccer
 Reducing Tablet
 Drilling
 Hypno Fubble
 Fubble and the Sport
 Dudd, the Sculptor
 Tempus Fugit
 The Burial
 Sharing
 Fubble's Slave
 Surprise Party
 Bowling
 The Crack of Football
 Astral Panic
 By a Hairbreadth
 Fubble's Present 
 Western
 Smoke Signals
 Crazy Dance
 Lottery
 Dudd is a Genius
 Remote-Controlled Glumpers
 Fishing
 Full Throttle
 Glumperina Jolie
 Painting the House
 Chewing Gum
 Deep Red
 Love is Blind and... Shortsighted
 The Books will get you go far
 Frantic Chase
 Channel Hopping
 Dudd's Odyssey
 Roller Skating
 Rat Poison
 Bath Time
 The Suspension Bridge
 Rap Dudd
 Pillage
 Sweet Dreams
 3 Glumpers and a Feeding Bottle
 Cupid Dudd
 Mad About Glumperina
 Dudd's Cake
 Graffiti
 Footballitis
 SMS
 Amazing Trip
 Ecological Spirit
 Gobo Claus 
 Training 
 Stop Searching
 The Best Goalkeeper
 Frankensbird
 World of Glumpercraft
 The Magic Wand
 Flies
 Hot Stuff
 Practical Jokes
 The Baby
 The Magic Lamp
 Snowboard
 Drowsy Tale
 Dudd's Birthday
 Karate Dudd
 Oculist
 Quigly, Stay Quiet
 Sweet Toothed Vision
 Earthquake
 Zoo Visit
 The Pied Piper of Hamelin
 Sound Movies
 Pizza Delivery

Extras
 Bulking Up
 Growth Gun
 Splashing Around
 The Great Escake

http://www.motionkids-tv.com/en/episode-list-by-series/list-of-episodes-of-glumpers/

International Broadcast
eToonz+ (South Africa)
TVC (Catalonia) 
RAI (Italy) 
NRK (Norway) 
MediaCorp (Singapore) 
My Toons (UK) 
Jojo (Turkey) 
Pop Oto (Slovenia) 
Indosiar, Global TV (Indonesia) 
Orlando Kids (Bosnia and Herzegovina, Croatia, Slovenia, Macedonia, Montenegro and Serbia) 
Pebble TV (Belgium, Holland, Luxembourg)
Qubo Tv (United States) 
Nelonen (Finland) 
TV Igle (Russia)
MCM (France)
Astro Ceria (Malaysia)
¡Sorpresa! (US)
Toons.TV (US)
Nickelodeon (Portugal)
Smile Tv US

External links 
 
 YouTube Channel

Spanish children's animated comedy television series
Children's television characters
Computer-animated television series
Animated television series without speech